Kudal Assembly constituency is one of the 288 Vidhan Sabha (Legislative Assembly) constituencies of Maharashtra state in Western India. This Assembly constituency is located in the Sindhudurg district.

Members of Legislative Assembly

Election results

2009

2014

2019

See also
 Kudal
 List of constituencies of Maharashtra Vidhan Sabha

References

Assembly constituencies of Maharashtra
Sindhudurg district